Belen is a village in Tarsus district of Mersin Province, Turkey. It is situated in the Taurus Mountains. The population of Belen was 684  as of 2011. The area around Belen was populated in the Roman Empire era of the 2nd and 3rd centuries, evident from a necropolis area next to the village, but the village was founded during the Ottoman period. Main economic activities are agriculture animal breeding and poultry husbandry.

References

External links
Village page
Images

Villages in Tarsus District